Satna Airport  is a domestic airport near Satna in Madhya Pradesh, India.

See also
 Airports in India
 List of busiest airports in India by passenger traffic

References

 

Satna
Airports in Madhya Pradesh
Buildings and structures in Madhya Pradesh
Year of establishment missing